Zhangheotheriidae is a possibly paraphyletic family of "symmetrodont" mammals that is currently known from Early Cretaceous deposits in China and Russia. Five genera are currently recognized, Anebodon, Kiyatherium, Maotherium, Origolestes, and Zhangheotherium.

References

Symmetrodonta
Prehistoric mammal families
Early Cretaceous mammals of Asia